The 2015 General Aung San Shield is the first season of Myanmar knockout football competition. The tournament is organized by the Myanmar Football Federation. It is the league cup competition started in 2015 Myanmar football season. This cup succeeded the Myanmar Football Federation Cup. MFF has changed the cup competition style as follows.

In the first round, ten clubs competing in 2015 MNL-2 and two clubs which were promoted to 2015 MNL, twelve teams in total, will be involved playing at a neutral ground with six teams emerged as winners. In the second round, ten clubs competing in 2015 MNL and the six winners from the first round, sixteen teams in total, will be involved playing at a neutral ground with eight teams emerged as winners. The Quarter-finals will still be played as one-legged matches but the Semi-final will be competed as two-legged (Home and Away) matches.

The cup winner is guaranteed a place in the 2016 AFC Cup.

Prize fund

Results

Preliminary round
Preliminary round consists of two rounds for teams currently playing in the Regional League Division 1 level. The First round was held 25 April 2015.

First round

Second round

Quarterfinal

Semifinal

First leg

Second leg

Final

Top goalscorers

References

General Aung San Shield
2015 in Burmese football
2015 domestic association football cups